Londonthorpe is a village to the east of Grantham, in the civil parish of Londonthorpe and Harrowby Without, in South Kesteven district of  Lincolnshire, England.

The village is part of the civil parish of Londonthorpe and Harrowby Without. Until 1931 Londonthorpe had been a civil parish in its own right.

According to A Dictionary of British Place Names 'Londonthorpe' derives from the Old Scandinavian lundr+thorp, meaning an "outlying farmstead or hamlet by a grove." In the Domesday account the village is written as "Lundertorp."

The parish is centred on Grade II listed Harrowby Hall, Londonthorpe previously being an estate village of Harrowby Estate. The village listed buildings include The Grange farm house, the Manor House, and various other houses and cottages. Listed buildings within the larger Londonthorpe and Harrowby parish include the Officer's Mess of the Second World War RAF Spitalgate, and buildings and structures within Belton Park.

The Grade II* listed parish church is dedicated to St John Baptist, the tower of which dates to the early 13th century and parts of the rood screen to the 15th. The church was rebuilt with a new roof in 1850, with considerable further restoration taking place in 1879. The churchyard contains the war graves of 32 Commonwealth armed service personnel of the First World War, at which time an army training camp existed at Belton Park to the west.

Earthworks of unknown origin lie to the west of the church

Londonthorpe Wood, created in 1993 by the Woodland Trust, and Alma Park Wood are within the parish  to the west. The parish also includes Prince William of Gloucester Barracks (previously RAF Spitalgate) and parts of eastern Grantham, particularly Alma Park Industrial Estate.

During the 1930s the parish was a centre for the Land Settlement Association scheme, a social experiment where unemployed Durham and South Wales miners were offered specially built cottages with smallholdings of land and livestock, to encourage self-sufficiency.

References

External links

Grantham
Villages in Lincolnshire
Former civil parishes in Lincolnshire
South Kesteven District